Boneh-ye Nejat (also Romanized as Boneh-ye Nejāt) is a village in Shoaybiyeh-ye Gharbi Rural District, Shadravan District, Shushtar County, Khuzestan Province, Iran. At the 2006 census, its population was 133, in 28 families.

References 

Populated places in Shushtar County